Speed Busters (known in North America as Speed Busters: American Highways) is a video game developed by Ubisoft's Montreal studio for Microsoft Windows in 1998. It was released for the Dreamcast in 1999 as Speed Devils. It is a racing game in which the courses feature hazards such as dinosaurs rolling boulders, and UFOs in exotic locales including Louisiana, Louisiana Tornado, New York City, New York City Winter, Mexico, Nevada, Aspen Summer, Aspen Winter, Canada (Supposedly northern Quebec), Canada Light Winter, Canada Heavy Winter, Montreal Industrial, Hollywood, and Hollywood Disaster. The console version's career mode allowed the player to rise themselves through the ranks of a fictional racing league. Colourful rivals challenge the player to accomplish certain feats during races, making accompanying bets using prize money from competition. Money earned from gambling and performance is used to buy cars, upgrade them, and maintain them. The game also supports five players on one Dreamcast console.

Sega released Speed Devils Online Racing, an updated version of the game in 2000 for Dreamcast that added online play.

Reception

Speed Busters: American Highways and Speed Devils received favourable reviews, while the mobile version of the latter received mixed reviews, according to the review aggregation website GameRankings. GameRevolution wrote a review on the Dreamcast version, saying, "At the finish line, Speed Devils is an above-average racer, but not much more." The reviewer said the game had good graphics and cool cars but suffered from poorly made tracks that leave the player wondering how they managed to drive off a cliff without noticing the cliff in front of them. The article also criticized the game's two-player mode for being boring and drawn out. Edge gave the same console version seven out of ten, saying, "While not outstanding in any particular regard, Speed Devils is good entertainment that should captivate anyone tired of realistic racers with its accessible and player-friendly arcade-like nature." Chris Charla of NextGen called the same console version "the best racing game you can find on Dreamcast today." In Japan, where the same console version was ported for release on November 18, 1999, Famitsu gave it a score of 29 out of 40.

Nick Smith of AllGame gave Speed Busters: American Highways three-and-a-half stars out of five, saying, "You'll have a fast and furious time with SpeedBusters  - but only if you have a competent graphics card. If you've got a puny PC with little video memory, forget it." However, Jonathan Sutyak gave Speed Devils two-and-a-half stars out of five, saying, "if you can overlook the obstacles, or even enjoy them, you may get a kick out of some of the races. Although despite being able to run tracks in the opposite direction with some different obstacles Speed Devils becomes repetitive due to the long laps of each track and the weak computer opponents. They will try to block you sometimes when you try to pass and they will also ram into you, but ultimately they do not provide an exceptional challenge."

Speed Devils Online Racing

Speed Devils Online Racing received "generally favorable reviews" according to the review aggregation website Metacritic.

See also
 Asphalt, a series of arcade racing games by Gameloft

References

External links
 
 

1998 video games
Dreamcast games
Mobile games
Racing video games
Ubisoft games
Video games developed in Canada
Windows games